Olga Aleksandrovna Rukavishnikova (born March 13, 1955 in Severodvinsk, Arkhangelsk) is a Soviet athlete who mainly competed in the women's pentathlon event during her career.

Biography
She competed for the USSR in the 1980 Summer Olympics held in Moscow, in the Pentathlon where she won the silver medal splitting team mates Nadiya Tkachenko and Olga Kuragina for a Soviet clean sweep in what was the last Olympic pentathlon leading to the introduction of the heptathlon for women.

She had the shortest ever reign of a track and field world record holder - 0.4 seconds. When she crossed the finish line at the end of the 800 metres, the final event of the 1980 Olympic pentathlon, her score of 4937 points was a new world record, but 0.4 seconds later Tkachenko finished and set a new record of 5083 points.

References

sports-reference

1955 births
Living people
People from Severodvinsk
Russian pentathletes
Soviet pentathletes
Olympic athletes of the Soviet Union
Olympic silver medalists for the Soviet Union
Athletes (track and field) at the 1980 Summer Olympics
Russian female athletes
Soviet female athletes
Medalists at the 1980 Summer Olympics
Olympic silver medalists in athletics (track and field)
Universiade medalists in athletics (track and field)
Universiade bronze medalists for the Soviet Union
Medalists at the 1975 Summer Universiade
Sportspeople from Arkhangelsk Oblast